Zlončice is a municipality and village in Mělník District in the Central Bohemian Region of the Czech Republic. It has about 600 inhabitants.

Administrative parts
The hamlet of Dolánky is an administrative part of Zlončice.

Geography
It lies in the Prague Plateau. It is situated on a river terrace on the right bank of the Vltava River.

History
The first written mention of Zlončice is from 1052.

A part of Zlončice was badly damaged by the 2002 European floods.

Sights
There are no cultural monuments in the municipality.

Gallery

References

External links

Villages in Mělník District